The 2009–10 Dayton Flyers men's basketball team represented the University of Dayton in the 2009–10 college basketball season. This was head coach Brian Gregory's seventh season at Dayton. The Flyers compete in the Atlantic 10 Conference and played their home games at the University of Dayton Arena. They finished the season 25–12, 8–8 in A-10 play and lost in the quarterfinals of the 2010 Atlantic 10 men's basketball tournament. They were invited to and were champions of the 2010 National Invitation Tournament.

Roster

Schedule and results

|-
!colspan=9 style=| Exhibition

|-
!colspan=9 style=| Regular Season

|-
!colspan=9 style=| Atlantic 10 tournament

|-
!colspan=9 style=| NIT

References

Dayton
Dayton Flyers men's basketball seasons
Dayton
National Invitation Tournament championship seasons
Dayton
Dayton